Lay Bid (also Romanized as Lāy Bīd and Lāibid; also known as Lāybīd Bālā, Lāybīd-e Bālā, Lāy Bīd-e Pā’īn, Layé Bīd, Layé Bid, Lāy-e Bīd Bālā, and Lāy-e Bīd-e Pā’īn) is a city in Zarkan Rural District, Meymeh District, Shahin Shahr and Meymeh County, Isfahan Province, Iran. At the 2006 census, its population was 1,986, in 510 families.

References 

Populated places in Shahin Shahr and Meymeh County
Cities in Isfahan Province